Three Figures is an outdoor sculpture by American artist Mark Bulwinkle, located at Northeast 13th Avenue and Northeast Holladay Street in Portland, Oregon's Lloyd District. Originally installed at AVIA's corporate headquarters, the figures were donated to the City of Portland and relocated to their current location "to appear to be enjoying the green space". Three Figures is part of the City of Portland and Multnomah County Public Art Collection courtesy of the Regional Arts & Culture Council.

See also

 1992 in art

References

External links
 Three Figures at the Public Art Archive
 Portland Cultural Tours: Public Art Walking Tour (PDF), Regional Arts & Culture Council

1992 establishments in Oregon
1992 sculptures
Bronze sculptures in Oregon
Lloyd District, Portland, Oregon
Northeast Portland, Oregon
Outdoor sculptures in Portland, Oregon
Statues in Portland, Oregon
Steel sculptures in Oregon